Iranian Research Organization for Science and Technology (IROST) (in ) is a comprehensive science policy research center directly attached to the Ministry of Science, Research and Technology of Iran which was approved and ratified by Revolutionary Council of Iran in 1980. IROST is the biggest research center in Iran and is particularly engaged in development of strategies, policies, R&D systems, management, foresight and evaluation of related Science and Technology (S&T) development and S&T for economic progress.

IROST has made advances in providing alternative sources of energy, namely solar energy, biodiesel from microalgae and bi-ethanol from agricultural waste. IROST has also made progress in pharmacological fields.

IROST undertakes commissioned research with International Organizations such as,

 United Nations Educational, Scientific and Cultural Organization (UNESCO)
 World Intellectual Property Organization (WIPO)
 United Nations Development Programme (UNDP)
 Organisation of Islamic Conference Standing Committee on Scientific & Technological Cooperation (COMSTECH)
 Commission on Science and Technology for Sustainable Development in the South (COMSATS)
 Third World Academy of Science (TWAS)
 Islamic Educational, Scientific and Cultural Organization (ISESCO)
 International Federation of Inventors' Associations (IFIA)
 Asian Pacific Center for Transfer of Technology (APCTT)
 Indian Ocean Rim Association for Regional Cooperation (IOR-ARC)

See also
Science and technology in Iran
Intellectual property in Iran

References

External links 

Science and technology in Iran
Scientific organisations based in Iran